A number of vessels have been named Ocean Victory

, an Ocean ship in service 1942–1963
MY Ocean Victory, a motor yacht built in 2009
MY Ocean Victory, a  motor yacht built in 2014
semi-submersible , a drilling rig

Ship names